Deirdre Flint is an American satirical folk-rock singer-songwriter. A former elementary school teacher, she joined the folk/comedy group Four Bitchin' Babes in 2005.

Her music has appeared on the Dr. Demento radio show and on the television show Nip/Tuck, as well as on The Learning Channel's "A Dating Story" and documentary "Always A Bridesmaid". Her songs, such as "Cheerleader," "The Boob Fairy," and "Past Life Regressed," deal with offbeat topics, often from the perspective of a ditzy female character. She has performed in more than 50 venues across the United States, including The Kennedy Center, and has been reviewed in publications such as The Christian Science Monitor, The Washington Post, and Billboard Magazine, which called her "Shuffleboard Queens" album, "grown-up satire with a non-cynical wink".

Awards and honors
Flint won the New Folk songwriting prize at the Kerrville Folk Festival in 2000, and was Falcon Ridge Folk Festival Showcase Artist that same year.

Discography
 The Christmas Sweater Song (2012)
 The Shuffleboard Queens (1999)
 Then Again (2002)

References

External links
 Official web site

American satirists
American women singers
American folk musicians
Living people
Four Bitchin' Babes members
American women songwriters
Year of birth missing (living people)
American women non-fiction writers
Women satirists
21st-century American women